Walrath-Van Horne House is a historic home located at Nelliston in Montgomery County, New York.  It was built in 1842 and was originally a -story Greek Revival stone house with a full-height portico.  In 1895, a frame, shingled second story topped by a Mansard roof and new porch with mansard styling replaced the original.  The house retains some Greek Revival interior styling, but the exterior has a Second Empire style.

It was added to the National Register of Historic Places in 1980.

References

Houses on the National Register of Historic Places in New York (state)
Houses completed in 1842
Second Empire architecture in New York (state)
Houses in Montgomery County, New York
National Register of Historic Places in Montgomery County, New York